Ombitasvir is an antiviral drug for the treatment of hepatitis C virus (HCV) infection by AbbVie.  In the United States, it is approved by the Food and Drug Administration for use in combination with paritaprevir, ritonavir and dasabuvir in the product Viekira Pak for the treatment of HCV genotype 1, and with paritaprevir and ritonavir in the product Technivie for the treatment of HCV genotype 4.

Ombitasvir is an NS5A inhibitor that acts by inhibiting the HCV protein NS5A.

See also 
 Discovery and development of NS5A inhibitors

References

Further reading 

 
 

Breakthrough therapy
Carbamates
NS5A inhibitors
Pyrrolidines